All Flesh Is Grass is the second studio album by Norwegian metal band Madder Mortem, released on 5 March 2001 through Century Media Records.  It was recorded in Studio Underground, Västerås, Sweden, in October 2000.

The title refers to the phrase "All flesh is grass", an extract from the Old Testament Book of Isaiah 40:6, meaning that human life is transitory.

Track listing

Personnel 
Madder Mortem
Agnete M. Kirkevaag – lead vocals
BP M. Kirkevaag – guitars, percussion, backing vocals
Eirik Ulvo Langnes – guitars
Paul Mozart Bjørke – bass, keyboards, backing vocals
Mads Solås – drums, percussion, backing vocals
Additional musician: Lennart Glenberg-Eriksson – violin

Production
Produced by Madder Mortem and Pelle Saether
Engineered by Pelle Saether and Lars Lindèn
Mixed by Pelle Saether
Mastering by Ulf Horbelt at DMS, Marl, Germany

References 

2001 albums
Madder Mortem albums
Century Media Records albums